The Gruffalo's Child is a 2011 short computer animated television film based on the 2004 picture book of the same name written by Julia Donaldson and illustrated by Axel Scheffler. A sequel to The Gruffalo, the film was shown on Christmas Day 2011 in the United Kingdom, exactly two years after the debut of the first film.

Directed by Johannes Weiland and Uwe Heidschotter, the film was produced by Michael Rose and Martin Pope of Magic Light Pictures, London, in association with Studio Soi in Ludwigsburg, Germany. In June 2013, the film was given the Award for Best TV Special at the 8th Festival of European Animated Feature Films and TV Specials. It was nominated for the British Academy Children's Award for Animation in 2012.

Plot
In a snowy wood, the daughter squirrel shows her brother footprints in the snow, telling him they are the Gruffalo's. The son squirrel tells their mother. However, the Mother Squirrel says the footprints are too small to be a Gruffalo and tells her children the story of the Gruffalo's child.

The story begins with the Gruffalo's daughter attempting to follow a hedgehog into the deep dark wood. The Gruffalo however forbids it, and tells her about the time he met the mouse. He can not remember what the mouse looks like and describes him as a monster, calling him "the big bad mouse", and his daughter imagines the mouse to be just as her father depicts him.

That night, however, the Gruffalo's daughter decides to explore the deep dark world and find the big bad mouse. On her journey, she follows footprints and meets the animals from the previous story (first the snake, then the owl, and finally the fox), who tell her where to find the mouse. She finally decides that the monster does not exist and that the animals and her father tricked her. She notices the mouse and when she threatens to eat him, he manipulates her to let him show her the monster is real. He makes a scary shadow in the moonlight on the branch of a hazel tree. The Gruffalo's child believes the shadow to be the big bad mouse and runs out of the forest in fear, with the mouse following her. In the Gruffalo cave, she is now comfortable at her father's side and the mouse watches over them.

When the Mother Squirrel finishes the story, her daughter reveals that she made the Gruffalo footprints to prank her brother and they go to play.

Voice cast
 Helena Bonham Carter as Mother Squirrel/Narrator
 Shirley Henderson as The Gruffalo's Child
 Robbie Coltrane as The Gruffalo
 James Corden as Mouse
 Tom Wilkinson as Fox
 John Hurt as Owl
 Rob Brydon as Snake
 Sam Lewis as First Little Squirrel
 Phoebe Givron-Taylor as Second Little Squirrel

References

External links
 Magic Light Pictures
 
 

2011 films
2011 short films
2011 television films
2011 computer-animated films
2010s children's films
2010s animated short films
British children's films
British computer-animated films
British animated short films
British television films
German children's films
German computer-animated films
German animated short films
German television films
English-language German films
Donaldson and Scheffler
Animated films based on children's books
Films about mice and rats
Animated films about foxes
Films about owls
Films about snakes
Animated films about squirrels
Films set in forests
BBC Film films
2010s English-language films
2010s British films
2010s German films
ZDF original programming